Elachista bimaculata is a moth in the family Elachistidae. It was described by Parenti in 1981. It is found in the country of Iran.

References

Moths described in 1981
bimaculata
Moths of Asia